is a Japanese former Nippon Professional Baseball outfielder.

References 

1970 births
Living people
Baseball people from Wakayama Prefecture 
Japanese baseball players
Nippon Professional Baseball outfielders
Seibu Lions players
Chiba Lotte Marines players
Nippon Professional Baseball coaches
Japanese baseball coaches